Holothrips is a genus of thrips in the family Phlaeothripidae, first described in 1911 by Heinrich Hugo Karny. The type species is Holothrips ingens.

Thrips from this genus feed on fungus.

Species 
 Holothrips aberrans
 Holothrips acutus
 Holothrips adelos
 Holothrips africanus
 Holothrips ambitus
 Holothrips amplus
 Holothrips anahuacensis
 Holothrips ananthakrishnani
 Holothrips andamanensis
 Holothrips andrei
 Holothrips angulatus
 Holothrips angulus
 Holothrips antennalis
 Holothrips apoensis
 Holothrips armatus
 Holothrips aspericaudus
 Holothrips attenuatus
 Holothrips australis
 Holothrips bellulus
 Holothrips bicolor
 Holothrips bipartitus
 Holothrips bratleyi
 Holothrips breedyi
 Holothrips breviceps
 Holothrips brevicollis
 Holothrips brevitubus
 Holothrips buccalis
 Holothrips bunyai
 Holothrips bursarius
 Holothrips caribbeicus
 Holothrips castanicolor
 Holothrips caudatus
 Holothrips celebensis
 Holothrips cephalicus
 Holothrips circulus
 Holothrips citricornis
 Holothrips conicurus
 Holothrips connaticornis
 Holothrips cornutus
 Holothrips coveri
 Holothrips cracens
 Holothrips cupreus
 Holothrips curvidens
 Holothrips durangoensis
 Holothrips eucharis
 Holothrips eurytis
 Holothrips falcatus
 Holothrips federicae
 Holothrips flavicornis
 Holothrips flavitubus
 Holothrips flavocastaneus
 Holothrips flavus
 Holothrips formosanus
 Holothrips formosus
 Holothrips frerei
 Holothrips fumidus
 Holothrips graminicolus
 Holothrips grandis
 Holothrips guanacastensis
 Holothrips hagai
 Holothrips hammockensis
 Holothrips hasegawai
 Holothrips hunanensis
 Holothrips indicus
 Holothrips ingens
 Holothrips insignis
 Holothrips japonicus
 Holothrips junctus
 Holothrips kuntiae
 Holothrips lafoae
 Holothrips lamingtoni
 Holothrips lanei
 Holothrips latidentis
 Holothrips lilianae
 Holothrips lucyae
 Holothrips luminosus
 Holothrips luteus
 Holothrips macrurus
 Holothrips madreselvensis
 Holothrips magnificus
 Holothrips maxillae
 Holothrips minor
 Holothrips mirandus
 Holothrips moundi
 Holothrips nepalensis
 Holothrips nigripes
 Holothrips nigritus
 Holothrips notialis
 Holothrips obscurifemorae
 Holothrips oceanicus
 Holothrips ogasawarensis
 Holothrips okinawanus
 Holothrips palmarum
 Holothrips palmerae
 Holothrips parallelus
 Holothrips peltatus
 Holothrips peninsulae
 Holothrips pericles
 Holothrips peruvianus
 Holothrips phaeura
 Holothrips pictus
 Holothrips porifer
 Holothrips potosiensis
 Holothrips procerus
 Holothrips pulchellus
 Holothrips quadratocapitis
 Holothrips quadrisetis
 Holothrips ramuli
 Holothrips robustus
 Holothrips ruidus
 Holothrips ryukyuensis
 Holothrips sakimurai
 Holothrips sawadai
 Holothrips schaubergeri
 Holothrips sculptilis
 Holothrips semiflavus
 Holothrips setosus
 Holothrips skwarrae
 Holothrips soror
 Holothrips speciossissimus
 Holothrips sporophagus
 Holothrips stannardi
 Holothrips storki
 Holothrips subtilis
 Holothrips tibialis
 Holothrips titschacki
 Holothrips torajanus
 Holothrips torosus
 Holothrips tubiculus
 Holothrips tumidus
 Holothrips typicus
 Holothrips umbricola
 Holothrips umbrosus
 Holothrips unicolor
 Holothrips woytkowski
 Holothrips xanthopus
 Holothrips yuasai
 Holothrips yurikoae
 Holothrips zaidae
 Holothrips zimmermanni

References

External links 

 Wikithrips Factsheet: Holothrips
Wikithrips: Holothrips

Phlaeothripidae
Thrips
Thrips genera
Insects described in 1911
Taxa named by Heinrich Hugo Karny